Carroll Edward Adams Jr. (June 7, 1923 – May 12, 1970) was an American brigadier general who was one of the highest-ranked American military officers killed during the Vietnam War. He was the commander of 937th Engineer Group.  Adams was killed in the same UH-1 helicopter crash as Major General John A. B. Dillard. He is aircraft commander of the helicopter.

References

External links
 

1923 births
1970 deaths
American military personnel killed in the Vietnam War
Brigadier generals
United States Army generals
United States Army personnel of the Vietnam War